The 2019 NCAA Division I Women's Basketball Championship Game was the final game of the 2019 NCAA Division I women's basketball tournament. It determined the national champion for the 2018–19 NCAA Division I women's basketball season. The game was played on April 7, 2019, at the Amalie Arena in Tampa, Florida, between Notre Dame and Baylor. Baylor won its third NCAA Championship, defeating the Fighting Irish, 82-81.

Participants

Notre Dame

Notre Dame, led by 32nd-year head coach Muffet McGraw, finished the regular season with a record of 27–3. They posted a 14–3 conference record, earning them the No. 1 seed in the ACC tournament, where they defeated No. 8 seed North Carolina, No. 5 seed Syracuse, and No. 2 seed Louisville en route to a conference championship. In the NCAA Tournament, the Fighting Irish received a No. 1 seed in the Chicago Regional. They defeated No. 16 seed Bethune–Cookman and No. 9 seed Michigan State to reach the Sweet Sixteen, where they beat No. 4 seed Texas A&M. They then advanced to the Elite Eight, where they won the Regional by defeating No. 2 seed Stanford. This win put the Fighting Irish in the Final Four, where they beat the Albany Regional champions, No. 2 seed Connecticut, to reach the national championship.

Two Notre Dame players were selected to the Chicago Regional all tournament team: Arike Ogunbowale and Jessica Shepard.

Baylor

Baylor, led by 18th-year head coach Kim Mulkey, finished the regular season with a record of 28–1. They posted a 18–0 conference record, earning them the No. 1 seed in the Big 12 Tournament, where they defeated No. 9 seed Texas Tech, No. 5 seed Kansas State, and No. 2 seed Iowa State en route to a conference championship. In the NCAA Tournament, the Lady Bears received a No. 1 seed in the Greensboro Regional. They defeated No. 16 seed Abilene Christian and No. 8 seed California to reach the Sweet Sixteen, where they easily beat No. 4 seed South Carolina. In the Elite Eight, the Lady Bears became Greensboro Regional champions by beating No. 2 seed Iowa, which they did by 32 points. In the Final Four, Baylor was matched up with the Portland Regional champions, No. 2 seed Oregon, whom they defeated by five to reach the national championship.

Four Baylor players were selected to the Greensboro Regional all tournament team: Lauren Cox, DiDi Richards, Chloe Jackson, and Kalani Brown.

Starting lineups

Game summary

Media coverage
The Championship Game was televised in the United States by ESPN.

See also
 2019 NCAA Division I Men's Basketball Championship Game
 2019 NCAA Division I women's basketball tournament

References

External links
 2019 NCAA Division I Women's Final Four

Championship
Notre Dame Fighting Irish women's basketball
Baylor Bears women's basketball
NCAA Division I Women's Basketball Championship Game
NCAA Division I Women's Basketball Championship Game
Basketball in Tampa, Florida
College sports in Florida
NCAA Division I Women's Basketball Championship Games
Sports competitions in Tampa, Florida